The Pope Estate is a historic home located in Camp Richardson, near South Lake Tahoe, California.

The home was originally built by Lloyd Tevis, former president of Wells Fargo Bank, in the 1880s. The Tevis and Pope families used the home and grounds as a summer vacation spot. The grounds contain several servants cabins and the main dwelling is constructed entirely of wood and shingle-clad sidings.

Gallery

References
Burke, Robert; McKowen, Ken (1996, Revised 2019). "Tallac Historic Site". Burke & McKowen Enterprises

Lake Tahoe
Houses on the National Register of Historic Places in California
Shingle Style architecture in California
Colonial Revival architecture in California
Houses completed in 1884
History of El Dorado County, California
History of the Sierra Nevada (United States)
Houses in El Dorado County, California
National Register of Historic Places in El Dorado County, California